= I Fell in Love, So I'm Streaming It =

Japanese manga series

- Cover of the printed volume

恋したので配信してみた (Koishita no de, Haishin shite Mita)
- Genre: Romantic comedy
- Manga
- Written by: Tama Azuma
- Published by: Comic Smart (digital); Media Factory (print, vol. 1 only)
- English publisher: NA: Mangamo
- Imprint: MF Comics (vol. 1 only)
- Magazine: Ganma!
- Original run: April 10, 2019 – July 17, 2024
- Volumes: 8

I Fell in Love, So I'm Streaming It (恋したので配信してみた, Koishita no de, Haishin shite Mita) is a Japanese manga series written and illustrated by Tama Azuma. It was serialized on Comic Smart's Ganma! manga service from April 2019 to July 2024, with its chapters compiled into eight volumes.

== Synopsis ==
Yu Inuzuka is a high school student who frightens people due to his appearance. As he moves into his new school's dormitory, he discovers that his roommates are all streamers. Inuzuka had stopped being a streamer to be a high schooler, and is now considering going back to it.

== Publication ==
Written and illustrated by Tama Azuma, I Fell in Love, So I'm Streaming It was serialized on Comic Smart's Ganma! manga service from April 10, 2019 to July 17, 2024. Its chapters were compiled into eight ebook volumes released from August 1, 2021, to October 1, 2024. Media Factory released a single tankōbon volume on March 21, 2020.

The series' chapters are published in English on the Mangamo app.

No.	Release date	ISBN
1	March 21, 2020 (orignal); August 1, 2021 (ebook)	978-4-04-064555-1
2	October 1, 2021 (ebook)	—
3	November 1, 2021 (ebook)	—
4	January 1, 2022 (ebook)	—
5	February 15, 2022 (ebook)	—
6	December 1, 2022 (ebook)	—
7	November 1, 2023 (ebook)	—
8	October 1, 2024 (ebook)	—

== Reception ==
The series was nominated for the sixth Next Manga Awards in 2020 in the web category.
